Sianna Ushandi Ginger (born 26 July 2005) is an Australian cricketer who currently plays for Queensland in the Women's National Cricket League (WNCL). She plays as a right-handed batter and right-arm medium bowler.

Domestic career
Ginger plays grade cricket for Valley District Cricket Club. In December 2022, Ginger captained Queensland at the Cricket Australia Under-19 National Female Championships, and was the third-highest run-scorer in the tournament, with 237 runs. Ginger was first named in a senior Queensland squad in February 2023. She made her debut for the side on 17 February 2023, against South Australia in the WNCL, scoring 33 runs. She followed this up two days later by scoring 35 from 30 deliveries against the same opposition.

International career
In December 2022, Ginger was named in the Australia Under-19 squad for the 2023 ICC Under-19 Women's T20 World Cup. She played five matches in the tournament, scoring 55 runs and taking seven wickets at an average of 5.57. She took figures of 3/13 against both India and England.

References

External links
 
 

2005 births
Living people
Sportspeople from Townsville
Australian women cricketers
Queensland Fire cricketers